A State of Vine is a 2007 American documentary film about winemaking directed by Don Scioli.  With insight and commentary from many members of the wine world – including Two Buck Chuck's Fred Franzia, champion racecar driver and winery owner Mario Andretti, award-winning winemakers, Bob Foley of Pride Mountain Vineyards, Daniel Barron of Silver Oak Cellars and Randy Pitts of Harvest Moon Estate Winery, along with many others.

The film was produced by Marin County based film company Zan Media.

References

External links
Home page for A State of Vine

DOCUMENTARY FILMMAKERS TAKE ENTERTAINING LOOK AT WINE INDUSTRY AND THE PEOPLE AND STORIES BEHIND IT at The Press Democrat

2007 films
Documentary films about wine
American documentary films
2007 documentary films
2000s English-language films
2000s American films